Headquarters Marine Corps (HQMC) is a headquarters staff within the Department of the Navy which includes the offices of the Commandant of the Marine Corps, the Assistant Commandant of the Marine Corps and various staff functions. The function, composition, and general duties of HQMC are defined in Title 10 of the United States Code, Subtitle C, Part I, Chapter 506 (Headquarters, Marine Corps).

HQMC "consists of the Commandant of the Marine Corps and those staff agencies that advise and assist him in discharging his responsibilities prescribed by law and higher authority. The Commandant is directly responsible to the Secretary of the Navy for the total performance of the Marine Corps. This includes the administration, discipline, internal organization, training, requirements, efficiency, and readiness of the service. The Commandant also is responsible for the operation of the Marine Corps material support system."

HQMC is currently spread throughout the Washington, D.C., Virginia, and Maryland area, to include the Pentagon, Henderson Hall, Marine Barracks, Washington, D.C., Marine Corps Base Quantico, and the Washington Navy Yard.

Agencies

 Aviation
 Chaplain of the Marine Corps
 Command, Control, Communications, and Computers
 Counsel for the Commandant
 Director, Marine Corps Staff
 Headquarters Battalion
 Health Services
 History Division
 Information
 Inspector General
 Deputy Commandant, Installations and Logistics (includes the Marine Corps Installations Command (MCICOM))
 Intelligence Department
 Logistics Modernization
 Marine Corps Recruiting Command
 Marine Corps Systems Command
 Manpower and Reserve Affairs
 Marine Corps Combat Development Command
 Marine Corps Community Services
Marine Corps Exchange
 Marine Corps Uniform Board
 Marine Corps Logistics Command
 Navy and Marine Corps Appellate Leave Activity
 Office of Legislative Affairs
 Plans, Policies and Operations
 Programs and Resources
 Public Affairs
 Safety Division
 Sexual Assault Prevention & Response Office (SAPRO)
 Staff Judge Advocate to the Commandant

See also

 Organization of the United States Marine Corps
 Office of the Chief of Naval Operations (U.S. Navy counterpart)

Notes

References

United States Marine Corps organization
Military headquarters in the United States